Torquil MacLeod (Modern Scottish Gaelic: Torcall MacLeòid) was the chief of Clan MacLeod of Lewis in around 1500. He was born in about 1460, and died before 1510. He is mentioned in 1498, and in 1506.

Torquil, the heir of Roderick MacLeod of Lewis, was the principal supporter of Domhnall Dubh, claimant to the Principality of the Isles, when Domhnall escaped from prison and raised the banner of insurrection in 1501, for the purpose of regaining the lordship of the Isles.
Torquil married (apparently as a later wife) Catharine Campbell, widow of Lachlan Og Maclean, and daughter of Colin Campbell, 1st Earl of Argyll, and the sister Mary Campbell, mother of Donald dubh.

In the end of the fifteenth century, king James IV of Scotland was endeavouring to put an end to the constant clan troubles in the Hebrides, caused by the efforts to revive the broken power of the Lord of the Isles.

Torquil was the most notable of the chiefs who resisted the efforts of the king’s lieutenants, first his brother-in-law, Archibald Campbell, 2nd Earl of Argyll, and afterwards Alexander Gordon, 3rd Earl of Huntly. It was only by the efforts of James IV himself that the Islesmen were finally brought to peaceful submission.

Torquil was the last of them all Islesmen who was subjugated. Torquil was Argyle’s brother-in-law.

After Torquil had been forfeited by command of Parliament, he retired to his stronghold of Stornoway Castle. He had with him his kinsman, Domhnall Dubh, son of that Angus Oigh who had won the battle of the Bloody Bay.

But in the end Stornoway Castle was captured by the Earl of Huntly, Domhnall Dubh was driven to Ireland, and the insurrection of the Islesmen brought to an end.

James IV forfeited all of Torquil's lands in 1506 because of the rebellion. When Torquil died (sometime before 1510), his heir was his son John. In 1511, Malcolm, Torquil's younger brother, re-acquired the forfeited ancestral lands of Lewis.

References

External links
 Genealogy of Torquil MacLeod

Chiefs of Clan MacLeod of Lewis